C. buckleyi may refer to:

Centrolene buckleyi
Columbina buckleyi

See also